Anton Bilek (20 November 1903 – 28 November 1991) was an Austrian football manager and former player.

Club career
During his plating career he played in Austrian top-league clubs Floridsdorfer AC, Admira Vienna and Wiener AC, before ending his career as a player/manager at Swiss side FC Solothurn.

International career
Anton Bilek made 2 appearances for the Austria national football team, one in 1927 and another in 1928.

Coaching career
He started his coaching career while he was still as player at Swiss side FC Solothurn. He then coached French sides FC Montreux-Sports and FC Lyon during mid-1930s, before coaching Yugoslav side SK Bata Borovo between 1936 and 1938.

References

1903 births
1991 deaths
Austrian footballers
Austria international footballers
Association football midfielders
Floridsdorfer AC players
Wiener AC players
FC Admira Wacker Mödling players
First Vienna FC players
FC Solothurn players
Expatriate footballers in Switzerland
Austrian football managers
FC Solothurn managers
Expatriate football managers in Switzerland
Expatriate football managers in France
HNK Borovo managers
Expatriate football managers in Yugoslavia
Austrian expatriate sportspeople in Switzerland